Corinth Depot, also known as the Southern/GM&O Depot and now known as Corinth Crossroads Museum, was constructed circa 1917, and is located at 221 North Fillmore Street, in Corinth, Mississippi. The depot is a contributing property to the Downtown Corinth Historic District, which was placed on the National Register of Historic Places in 1993.  In 1995, the depot was designated a Mississippi Landmark.

History 
In 1857, a parcel of land in Corinth was dedicated for construction of a depot where two railroads (the Memphis & Charleston and the Mobile & Ohio) intersected.  Because of this railroad junction, control of Corinth was of strategic importance during the American Civil War, which led to the Siege of Corinth and later the Second Battle of Corinth.

The present structure is the third depot to be constructed on the site.  The depot is a one-story, wood-frame building with a V-shaped floor plan, designed to accommodate the intersection of the two railways.  The exterior walls have stucco veneer with brick wainscot.  The two railways had separate brick portico entrances into the depot.  Passengers, that arrived for departure, entered the depot on the opposite side of the building, in the crook of the V.

The depot received its greatest usage during the 1930s and 1940s, when it served dozens of passenger trains.  In 2007, the depot became the home for the Corinth Crossroads Museum with displays of civil war artifacts, historic photographs, industrial items, and railroad souvenirs.

References 

Mississippi Landmarks
Former railway stations in Mississippi
National Register of Historic Places in Alcorn County, Mississippi
History museums in Mississippi
Tourist attractions in Alcorn County, Mississippi
Former Mobile and Ohio Railroad stations
Stations along Southern Railway lines in the United States
Railway stations in the United States opened in 1917
Railway stations on the National Register of Historic Places in Mississippi
Repurposed railway stations in the United States
Corinth, Mississippi